Degrassi is an unproduced Canadian teen drama television series and the intended sixth overall series in the Degrassi franchise created by Kit Hood and Linda Schuyler. Helmed by Lara Azzopardi and Julia Cohen, it was announced in January 2022 as a HBO Max original series which would premiere in early 2023. Had it moved forward, it would have been the sixth main series and second soft reboot since the Netflix production, Degrassi: Next Class, which ended in 2017, and the first series in the franchise to feature no involvement from Linda Schuyler. 

As the year progressed, no new details surfaced regarding its development, and the Warner Bros. Discovery merger in April led to rumours of its cancellation. In November that year, it was reported by the Wall Street Journal that the series was not moving forward. WildBrain later released a press statement that indicated their intent to find a new distributor.

Production

Announcement and synopsis
On January 13, 2022, it was announced that HBO Max gave a series order to Degrassi, a revival of the franchise of the same name consisting of 10 hour-long episodes. It was announced for a premiere in 2023. The announcement coincided with the platform's acquisition of all 14 seasons of Degrassi: The Next Generation, the fourth iteration of the franchise. Production was scheduled to begin in Toronto in the summer of 2022. Casting commenced for the series with a search for youth of all backgrounds aged 13 to 20. Filming was expected to begin on July 1, 2022, and end on November 30, 2022. 

The series was being developed by Lara Azzopardi and Julia Cohen, who previously wrote the Degrassi: The Next Generation episode "Heat of the Moment". Linda Schuyler, franchise co-creator, and Stephen Stohn, creative partner on The Next Generation, issued a joint statement confirming that they would not be involved in the new series, stating that the "time is perfect to pass the baton" to Azzopardi and Cohen.

The show was officially described as "a reprise of the original teen drama", focused on a group of teenagers and school faculty "living in the shadow of events that both bind them together and tear them apart". Tom Pritchard of Tom's Guide noted in May 2022, when no new details had emerged, that the offered synopsis "tells us next to nothing".

Cancellation 
As the year progressed, there were no new details regarding the reboot or its production aside from the initial announcement. In April 2022, three months after the reboot was announced, WarnerMedia merged with Discovery, Inc., forming Warner Bros. Discovery. Following the merger, numerous original scripted HBO Max projects were scrapped, including Batgirl, which was in post-production. By August 2022, rumours of the reboot's cancellation had begun to emerge in the wake of the news. On November 4, 2022, the Wall Street Journal reported that Degrassi was scrapped. According to The Hollywood Reporter, production had begun as planned but stopped shortly thereafter. The news triggered outcry from fans, and prompted criticism of HBO Max. Stephen Stohn later stated on Twitter that while they weren't involved in any discussions, he and Schuyler remained hopeful that a new series would begin production in the future regardless of HBO's decision. That same day, WildBrain released a statement that the company was still "committed to the future of Degrassi" and that "discussions concerning the contract with WarnerMedia are ongoing", indicating their intentions to find a new distributor.

References

External links
 
 Degrassi.tv

Degrassi (franchise)
HBO Max original programming
Sequel television series
English-language television shows
Television shows set in Toronto
Serial drama television series
Canadian television soap operas
Television series about teenagers
Television series reboots
Television series by DHX Media
Unproduced television shows